Kevin G. Nealer is a principal and partner in The Scowcroft Group, specializing in financial services, risk analysis, direct investment and trade policy.

Nealer has lead responsibility for the firm’s support for the investment community, providing analysis to leading currency and equity/debt traders. In addition, he assists industrial and financial clients in project planning and implementing investment and work-out strategies. He has developed regulatory and government affairs solutions for clients, including the largest American investor in China, international banks, and leading private equity funds.

On October 1, 2014, U.S. President Barack Obama appointed Nealer as a Member of the President’s Intelligence Advisory Board.

Before joining The Scowcroft Group, Nealer advised multinational clients on investment issues, project finance, and trade law/policy as a principal in the consulting affiliate of Washington's largest law firm, and as vice president for corporate affairs with a leading government strategies practice. A trade attorney and former State Department officer, Nealer served as trade policy advisor to the Senate Democratic Leadership from 1982 to 1987.

A Fulbright professor in the People's Republic of China (1990-1991), Mr. Nealer has served as a lecturer, program moderator, and adjunct professor of trade law and policy at the Georgetown University McDonough School of Business. Nealer received his undergraduate degree from the University of Michigan and his law degree from Case Western Reserve University School of Law. A member of the Council on Foreign Relations, he was an author of the Council’s report Beginning the Journey: China, The United States and the WTO, and other articles on political economy.

He is a member of the board of the Australian American Leadership Dialogue, the International Advisory Board of Ancora Capital Management, Pte, Ltd., and the International Affairs Visiting Committee of Case Western Reserve University. He is a consultant to the U.S. defense and intelligence communities on trade and economic security issues, and advised the Obama campaign on international economic and Asia policy.

Following his confirmation by the United States Senate on December 14, 2010, Nealer was sworn in as a member of the Board of Directors of the Overseas Private Investment Corporation, the development finance agency of the US government, where he served on the Audit and Governance Committees .

References

External links
 President Obama Announces More Key Administration Posts, 8/4/10 | The White House
 Kevin G. Nealer | The Scowcroft Group
 Georgetown University - School of Continuing Studies

Case Western Reserve University School of Law alumni
Living people
University of Michigan alumni
Year of birth missing (living people)